This is a list of notable individuals and events related to Turkmenistan in 2022.

Incumbents

Events

Ongoing 
Ongoing: COVID-19 pandemic in Turkmenistan

 12 March – 2022 Turkmenistan presidential election: A presidential election is held in Turkmenistan, with Serdar Berdimuhamedow expecting to be elected President of Turkmenistan to succeed his father, Gurbanguly Berdimuhamedow.
 15 March – Serdar Berdimuhamedow is elected President of Turkmenistan, succeeding his father Gurbanguly Berdimuhamedow.
 19 March – Serdar Berdimuhamedow is sworn in as President of Turkmenistan.
 26 June – Russian President Vladimir Putin embarks on a foreign trip to Tajikistan and Turkmenistan, his first since the Russian invasion of Ukraine.

Sports 

 9 – 18 August: Turkmenistan at the 2021 Islamic Solidarity Games
 17 June – 13 July: Turkmenistan at the 2022 World Aquatics Championships

See also 

 Outline of Turkmenistan
 Index of Turkmenistan-related articles
 List of Turkmenistan-related topics
 History of Turkmenistan

References

Further reading 

 
 

2022 in Turkmenistan
2020s in Turkmenistan
Years of the 21st century in Turkmenistan
Turkmenistan
Turkmenistan